Motajica is a mountain of  Bosnia and Herzegovina. It is a mountain island, because a few thousand years ago, when it was the Pannonian Sea, it and several other mountains in the Pannonian region were the islands.

See also
List of mountains in Bosnia and Herzegovina

References

Mountains of Bosnia and Herzegovina